James Burns may refer to:

Business
 James Burns (Australian shipowner) (1846–1923), Australian businessman
 James Burns (Canadian businessman) (1921–2019), Canadian businessman
 James Burns (merchant), Glasgow-born merchant of the 17th century
 James Burns (publisher) (1808–1871), Scottish publisher and author
 James Burns (Scottish shipowner) (1789–1871)
 James D. Burns (1865–1928), American businessman and owner of the Detroit Tigers
 James Ormston Burns (1925–1998), founder of Burns London, a guitar and amplifier company

Entertainment
 James MacGregor Burns (1918–2014), American biographer
 Jim Burns (born 1948), Welsh artist
 Jim Burns (poet) (born 1936), English poet
 Jim Burns (television producer) (1952–2017), American television producer and writer
 Jim Burns (Oz), character on the HBO series Oz
 Jimmy Burns (born 1943), American blues guitarist, singer and songwriter

Religion
 James Burns (Spiritualist) (1835–1894), Scottish journalist and publisher
 James A. Burns (1867–1940), American priest and president of the University of Notre Dame
 James Anderson Burns (1865–1945), founder of the Oneida Baptist Institute
 James Chalmers Burns (1809–1892), Scottish minister
 James Drummond Burns (1823–1864), Scottish Presbyterian minister and poet

Sports
 James Burns (cricketer) (1866–1957), English cricketer
 Farmer Burns (baseball) (James Joseph Burns, 1876–?), American baseball player
 Jamie Burns (born 1984), English footballer
 Jim Burns (baseball) (died 1909), 19th-century baseball player
 Jim Burns (basketball) (1945–2020), American basketball player
 Jim Burns (footballer) (born 1943), Scottish footballer

Other
 James Burns, 3rd Baron Inverclyde (1864–1919)
 James Glencairn Burns, son of poet Robert Burns
 J. H. Burns (James Henderson Burns, 1921–2012), Scottish historian
 J. Irving Burns (1843–1925), American lawyer and politician
 James M. Burns (judge) (1924–2001), U.S. federal judge
 James M. Burns (Medal of Honor) (1845–1910), Union Army soldier and officer during the American Civil War

See also
 James Burn (1849–?), Australian cricketer
 James Burnes (disambiguation)
 James Byrnes (disambiguation)
 James Byrne (disambiguation)